Francisco Múgica (10 April 1907 – 1985) was an Argentine film director, film editor and cinematographer. He was born and died in Buenos Aires.

Múgica initially began his career in film as a cinematographer in the mid-1930s but by 1939 he had become a film director directing his first film El Solterón early that year followed by the highly successful comedy Así es la vida. He directed some 25 films including the 1942 film Adolescencia. He retired from film in 1962.

Filmography
As editor

1933 Los tres berretines (The Three Whims)
1934 Ayer y hoy
1935 Buenos Aires Nights
1935 El caballo del pueblo (The Favorite)
1936 La muchachada de a bordo
1936 Radio Bar
1937 El cañonero de Giles
1937  The Boys Didn't Wear Hair Gel Before 
1938 Jettatore 

As cinematographer

1935 El caballo del pueblo (The Favorite)
1936 Poncho blanco 
1936 Radio Bar 
1937 El cañonero de Giles 
1937 Una porteña optimista 
1937 The Boys Didn't Wear Hair Gel Before 
1938 Three Argentines in Paris (exteriors) 
1938 Jettatore 

As director

1939 El solterón
1939 Margarita, Armando y su padre 
1939 Así es la vida
1940 Medio millón por una mujer 
1941 Honest Person Needed 
1941 Los martes, orquídeas (On Tuesdays, Orchids)
1941 El mejor papá del mundo (The Best Father in the World)
1942 Adolescencia 
1942 El pijama de Adán 
1942 The Journey 
1943 Daughter of the Minister 
1943 I Win the War 
1943 The Mirror 
1944 Mi novia es un fantasma 
1945 Back in the Seventies  
1946 Cristina 
1946 Deshojando margaritas 
1946 Milagro de amor (1946 film) 
1948 El barco sale a las diez 
1949 Esperanza 
1950 Piantadino
1951 La pícara cenicienta 
1952 Rescate de sangre 
1959 I Was Born in Buenos Aires 
1962 Mi Buenos Aires querido

External links
 

1907 births
People from Buenos Aires
Argentine film directors
Argentine cinematographers
1985 deaths